Jetsunma Tenzin Palmo (born 1943) is a bhikṣuṇī in the Drukpa Lineage of the Kagyu school of Tibetan Buddhism. She is an author, teacher and founder of the Dongyu Gatsal Ling Nunnery  in Himachal Pradesh, India. She is best known for being one of the very few Western yoginis trained in the East, having spent twelve years living in a remote cave in the Himalayas, three of those years in strict meditation retreat.

Vicki Mackenzie, who wrote Cave in the Snow about her, relates that what inspired the writing of the book was reading Tenzin Palmo's statement to a Buddhist magazine that "I have made a vow to attain Enlightenment in the female form - no matter how many lifetimes it takes".

Early life
Jetsunma Tenzin Palmo was born Diane Perry in Woolmers Park, Hertfordshire, on 30 June 1943.  Although spiritualist meetings were held in her childhood home, she realized at the age of 18 that she was a Buddhist when she read a library book on the subject. She moved to India at 20, where she taught English at the Young Lamas Home School for a few months before meeting her root lama, the 8th Khamtrul Rinpoche.

Career
In 1964 she became only the second Western woman to be ordained in the Vajrayana tradition, receiving the name Drubgyu Tenzin Palmo, or "Glorious Lady who Upholds the Doctrine of the Practice Succession". The ordination was as a śrāmaṇerī, or novice nun, the highest level of ordination available for women in the Tibetan tradition at the time because the bhikṣuṇī sangha had never been established there. However, with the support of her teacher, in 1973 Tenzin Palmo received the full bhikṣuṇī ordination in Hong Kong, one of the first Western women to do so.

Living at Khamtrul Rinpoche's monastery as the sole nun among 100 monks provided Tenzin Palmo with first-hand experience of the discrimination that restricted women’s access to information that was imparted freely to men. Eager for instruction, she felt frustrated by the fact that she was kept out of most monastic activities because of misogynistic prejudices. She recounts,

This phase lasted for six years. Then Tenzin Palmo left the monastery at her teacher’s suggestion to go to Lahaul in the higher reaches of the Indian Himalayas, where she would eventually enter the cave and launch herself into uninterrupted, intense spiritual practice.

The cave
In 1976 Tenzin Palmo commenced living in a cave in the Himalayas measuring 10 feet wide and six feet deep and remained there for 12 years, for three of which she was in full retreat. The cave was high in the remote Lahaul area of the Indian Himalayas (nearby Tayul Gompa), on the border of Himachal Pradesh and Tibet. In the course of the retreat she grew her own food and practised deep meditation based on ancient Buddhist methods. In accordance with protocol, she never lay down, sleeping in a traditional wooden meditation box in a meditative posture for just three hours a night. The last three years were spent in complete isolation. She survived temperatures of below −30° Fahrenheit (−35°C) and snow for six to eight months of the year.

Activism
Tenzin Palmo emerged from the cave in 1988 and travelled to Italy as visa problems meant she needed to leave India. Since her retreat Tenzin Palmo has taken on the cause of equal rights and opportunities for Buddhist nuns. In support of this, she spent several years travelling the world fundraising for a new Buddhist nunnery, as her root lama had asked her to do. In 2000, the Dongyu Gatsal Ling Nunnery was opened with the purpose of giving education and training to women from Tibet and the Himalayan border regions. At this nunnery, Tenzin Palmo also plans to re-establish the extinct lineage of togdenmas, a Drukpa Kagyu yogini order.

Tenzin Palmo is a member of the six member "Committee of Western Bhikshunis", an organisation of senior Western nuns supported by two Advisors from Taiwan – the Ven. Bhiksuni Heng-ching Shih, Professor of Philosophy at Taiwan National University [Gelongma ordination 1975 in San Francisco] and Ven. Bhikshuni Wu-yin, Vinaya Master. It was formed in the autumn of 2005, after the Dalai Lama told Bhikshuni Jampa Tsedroen that the Western bhikshunis should be more involved in helping to establish the bhikshuni ordination in the Tibetan tradition.

Recognition
On 16 February 2008, Tenzin Palmo received the title of Jetsunma (reverend lady) in recognition of her spiritual achievements as a nun and her efforts in promoting the status of female practitioners in Tibetan Buddhism by the head of the Drukpa Lineage, the 12th Gyalwang Drukpa,.

Books

 A collection of her teachings was released as the book Into the Heart of Life by Jetsunma Tenzin Palmo, Snow Lion Publications, 2011..
 Her life was profiled in the book Cave in the Snow by Vicki Mackenzie.
 Tenzin Palmo released a book containing some of her teachings: Reflections On A Mountain Lake: Teachings on Practical Buddhism.
 Three Teachings is a compilation of talks given by Tenzin Palmo in Singapore, in 1998. Three Teachings - Three Teachings

See also
Gelongma 
Ngagpa
Women in Buddhism

References

External links
Page of Dongyu Gatsal Ling Nunnery / http://www.tenzinpalmo.com/ 	
Tenzin Palmo is Watering the Nuns Interview in ascent magazine
Realising the Potential of Nuns, Interview with Tenzin Palmo at Dongyu Gyatsal Ling Nunnery, near Tashijong, India, September 2006 by Di Cousens
Buddhist Monastic Code II, Chapter 23 Bhikkhunīs, edition 2007 by Thanissaro Bhikkhu
Buddhist Monastic Code II, Chapter 8 Respect by Thanissaro Bhikkhu
The Path of the Yogini - A search for a true spiritual path which will lead aspirants beyond the awareness of gender identity by Jessica Torrens
Tenzin Palmo videos

Online texts
 Abstract: A brief overview of the situation for nuns in the Tibetan Tradition  speech by Bhiksuni Tenzin Palmo at the International Congress on Buddhist Women's Role in the Sangha

Media
H.H. Gyalwang Drukpa's explanation of "Jetsunma" Video
Buddhas kämpferische Nonne Das abenteuerliche Leben der Diane Perry 3sat 07-12-2008

Tibetan Buddhism writers
1943 births
Tibetan Buddhist nuns
Living people
British Buddhist nuns
Tibetan Buddhist spiritual teachers
Tibetan Buddhists from England
Converts to Buddhism
Tibetan Buddhist yogis
Women yogis
20th-century lamas
20th-century Buddhist nuns
21st-century Buddhist nuns
People related to Lahaul and Spiti district
Buddhist feminists